The Fontaine Molière is a fountain in the 1st arrondissement of Paris, at the junction of rue Molière and rue de Richelieu.

Its site was occupied by a fountain known as the fontaine Richelieu until 1838, when it was demolished due to interfering with traffic flow. Joseph Régnier, a member of the Comédie-Française, suggested a new fountain set back slightly from the previous fountain's site as a monument to the playwright Moliere. This was France's first national public subscription for a commemorative monument dedicated to a non-military figure. Built in 1844, the fountain was designed by several sculptors, headed by the architect Louis Tullius Joachim Visconti, who also designed the fountain in place Saint-Sulpice.

The main bronze sculpture, showing Moliere seated under a portico under an imposing arch, is by Bernard-Gabriel Seurre (1795–1875) and cast by the fonderie Eck et Durand. Under him is an inscription flanked by two marble female sculptures by Jean-Jacques Pradier (1792–1852), 'Serious Comedy' and 'Light Comedy' - each holds a scroll listing Moliere's works. Right at the bottom are lion masks, from which the water pours into a semi-circular basin. A commemorative medal for the fountain's inauguration was designed by François Augustin Caunois in 1844 - an example of it is in the musée Carnavalet (ND 0367).

Bibliography
  Marie-Hélène Levadé et Hugues Marcouyeau, Les fontaines de Paris : l'eau pour le plaisir - Paris, 2008 - 
  Daniel Rabreau, Paris et ses fontaines - Paris, 1997 -

See also
 List of works by James Pradier Sculpture

External links 

 Gallery of photos on the "Paris 1900" site

Moliere
Buildings and structures in the 1st arrondissement of Paris
Buildings and structures completed in 1844
19th-century architecture in France